Brandon Jones (born June 17, 1989) is a Canadian singer-songwriter from Quispamsis, New Brunswick. He was a competitor on season 4 of Canadian Idol and was eliminated on August 1, 2006, placing him 8th.

Canadian Idol 
Brandon auditioned for Canadian Idol in the city of his birth, St. John's, Newfoundland. However he was never in the bottom three until his elimination on August 1, 2006. With the release of his first CD in June 2007, the singer-songwriter plans to continue performing.

Songs Brandon performed on Canadian Idol
Top 22: Lady (Kenny Rogers)
Top 18: Somebody to Love (Queen)
Top 14: Easy (The Commodores)
Top 10: California (Wave)
Top 9: Jumpin' Jack Flash (Rolling Stones)
Top 8: I'll Be There for You (Bon Jovi)

Career after Canadian Idol 
Brandon was signed to the independent record label, Sound Of Pop, becoming the third contestant from Canadian Idol season 4 to be signed. He released his album "All For You" on June 19, 2007. The album contains ten tracks, including a cover of "California" by Wave. Brandon's first single, "Stain Of You", did well on New Brunswick radio stations, and he toured the east coast during the summer of 2007.   "Stain Of You" was also used in "It's Tricky", a 2007 episode of Degrassi: The Next Generation. His most recent single, from 2007, "Fallen" has received a lot of local air play time in his home town and surrounding areas. It is also currently listed as his most downloaded song on iTunes.

Personal life
Jones as of late 2010 resides in the city of Toronto, Ontario to focus on his budding music career. He recently graduated from Harris Institute and is still songwriting and singing. He plans on releasing an EP that consists of approximately 4 tracks in early 2011. Jones is currently focusing on recording local artists in his own recording studio.

All For You track list
1. Stain Of You
2. Chance For Love
3. In and Out
4. Fallen Out of love
5. If Only
6. California
7. September
8. Last Mistake Talking to You
9. Don't Give Up On Me Yet
10. Stain Of You (remix feat. Bubbles Melanson)

References

External links 
 Brandon Jones At CTV.ca
 Brandon Jones' Official Website
 Brandon Jones' Official Music Myspace
 Brandon's Record Label

1989 births
Living people
Musicians from St. John's, Newfoundland and Labrador
Canadian Idol participants
Musicians from New Brunswick